Upper Deckers Creek Wildlife Management Area, is located about  north of Reedsville, West Virginia in Preston County.

The WMA is accessed from County Route 27/3 about one mile north of Reedsville.

Hunting and fishing

Hunting opportunities are limited by the small size of the WMA and the nearby housing.  Waterfowl can be taken from the impoundments.

Upper Deckers Creek WMA provides fishing opportunities for bluegill.

Camping is not permitted at the WMA.

See also

Animal conservation
fishing
List of West Virginia wildlife management areas

References

External links
West Virginia DNR District 1 Wildlife Management Areas
West Virginia Hunting Regulations
West Virginia Fishing Regulations

Wildlife management areas of West Virginia
Protected areas of Preston County, West Virginia
IUCN Category V